Dracaena rockii, synonym Pleomele auwahiensis, commonly known as maui hala pepe, is a species of flowering plant that is endemic to the islands of Maui and Molokai in Hawaii. It is threatened by habitat loss.

References

 World Conservation Monitoring Centre 1998.  Pleomele auwahiensis.   2006 IUCN Red List of Threatened Species.   Downloaded on 23 August 2007.

rockii
Endemic flora of Hawaii
Biota of Maui
Biota of Molokai
Trees of Hawaii
Plants described in 1985
Taxonomy articles created by Polbot